Lough Shindilla is a freshwater lake in the west of Ireland. It is located in the Connemara area of County Galway.

Geography

Hydrology
Lough Shindilla flows east into Ardderry Lough. The lake, like other area lakes, is oligotrophic.

Natural history
Fish species in Lough Shindilla include brown trout, perch, Arctic char, salmon and the critically endangered European eel. Lough Shindilla is part of the Maumturk Mountains Special Area of Conservation.

See also
List of loughs in Ireland

References

Shindilla